Alfred E. Allnatt (19 February 1889 – 1969), known professionally as Major A.E. Allnatt, was an English businessman and art collector. He took over his father's supply business and developed it into Allnatt London Properties and other well-known businesses in England.

The Adoration of the Magi
Allnatt purchased Peter Paul Rubens' 1634 painting Adoration of the Magi for a record £275,000  in 1959 from the estate of the Duke of Westminster. Allnatt gave the painting to King's College in November 1961, and the painting was placed on permanent display in 1968 in the east end of the Chapel. The painting was estimated to be worth $2,400,000 in 1974, when it was damaged by vandals who scratched "IRA" in  letters across the front.

Allnatt Diamond

Alfred Allnatt also owned the Allnatt Diamond, which he purchased in the 1950s. At 101.29 carats (20.258 g), the Allnatt is the fourth-highest-priced yellow diamond ever sold at auction. The Allnatt Diamond is so strongly yellow that the GIA Gem Laboratory deemed it a Fancy Vivid yellow after examination in 2000. There are fewer than 12 diamonds known to exist in the world that weigh over 100 carats (20 g) with such strong colour.

The Allnatt diamond was recut to intensify its colour after being sold at auction in 1996. The original Allnatt Diamond weighed 102.07 carats (20.414 g) and was graded a Fancy Intense yellow by the GIA Gem Laboratory but after recutting to its present 101.29 carats (20.258 g), it was classified as Fancy Vivid yellow.

Ujiji

Allnatt also enjoyed horse racing. A horse named Ujiji owned by Allnatt finished third in the English Derby in June 1942 and first in the Gold Cup in 1943 at Newmarket, England.

Death

Allnatt died at his residence Doughty House in Richmond Hill, Surrey and his ashes were buried in the churchyard at Turville, Buckinghamshire.

Alfred Allnatt of England and Melvin Leroy Merritt of Portland, Oregon researched and published genealogy book of Allnatt history The Families of Allnutt & Allnatt in 1962 in England.

Residence in Ireland

Sandbrook was purchased by John and Mary Allnatt, whose herd of Blonde d'Aquitaine cattle was among the top prize winners at agricultural shows throughout Britain and Ireland, including the Royal Dublin Society Spring Show, the Royal Welsh Show, and the Royal Ulster Show. In the 1960s, Mrs. Allnatt purchased Rathmore Park for her son from her first marriage, Brendan Foody; but after he had decided not to return to live in Ireland, Rathmore was sold. He inherited Sandbrook following his mother's death in September 1987. The farm manager there is Joe Whelan.

References

1889 births
1969 deaths
Place of birth missing
20th-century English businesspeople